Johann Pollak (23 December 1948 – 15 September 2019) was an Austrian judoka. He competed at the 1972 Summer Olympics and the 1976 Summer Olympics.

References

1948 births
2019 deaths
Austrian male judoka
Olympic judoka of Austria
Judoka at the 1972 Summer Olympics
Judoka at the 1976 Summer Olympics
Sportspeople from Linz
20th-century Austrian people